Collegiate Neighborhood Historic District is a nationally recognized historic district located in Pella, Iowa, United States. It was listed on the National Register of Historic Places in 2017. The district is a residential area located between the central business district to the north and Central College to the south. It is the first historic district in Pella. The neighborhood contains architecture that was popular from the late 19th century to the mid-20th century. Most of the houses are single-family dwellings that are uniformly set back from the street. It also features buildings that were constructed according to traditional Dutch building practices that were brought to Pella in the 19th century by people who settled here from the Netherlands. Independence and West First Streets are paved with brick.

References

Pella, Iowa
Historic districts on the National Register of Historic Places in Iowa
National Register of Historic Places in Marion County, Iowa
Historic districts in Marion County, Iowa